Park Yun-Sun (December 11, 1905 – June 30, 1988) was a Korean biblical scholar born in Cholsan, North Pyongan Province. After completing his undergraduate studies at Soongsil University, he enrolled at Westminster Theological Seminary in the US. Then, he went on to Holland for further theological training (October 1953 - March 1954). In 1979, he completed his voluminous and historic scholarly work on the commentaries of all sixty-six books of the Old and New Testaments. 
Park has been considered to be the pre-eminent Calvin scholar in Korea. He taught at Kosin University (1946–1960), Chongshin University (1963–1974, 1979–1980), and Hapdong Theological Seminary (1980–1988).
   He introduced to Koreans the works of C. Hodge, Machen, Warfield, A. Kuyper, Bavinck, Schilder, and Greijdanus.

References 

1905 births
1988 deaths
20th-century Christian biblical scholars
Asian biblical scholars
Bible commentators
Calvinist and Reformed biblical scholars
People from North Pyongan
South Korean theologians
Westminster Theological Seminary alumni
Academic staff of Hapdong Theological Seminary